Brisbane Roar Football Club is an association football club based in Milton, Queensland.

The club was formed in 1957 as Hollandia-Inala FC and entered the new National A-League in 2005 as Queensland Roar (having withdrawn from the QLD State competition the previous year).

Key
Key to league competitions:

 A-League Men (A-League) – Australia's top soccer league, established in 2005
 National Soccer League (NSL) – The first tier of Australian soccer until the inception of the A-League Men in 2005.
 Brisbane Premier League (BPL) – The first-tier of Football in Brisbane.

Key to colours and symbols:

Key to league record:
 Season = The year and article of the season
 Pos = Final position
 Pld = Games played
 W = Games won
 D = Games drawn
 L = Games lost
 GF = Goals scored
 GA = Goals against
 Pts = Points

Key to cup record:
 En-dash (–) = Brisbane Roar did not participate
 R32 = Round of 32
 R16 = Round of 16
 QF = Quarter-finals
 SF = Semi-finals
 RU = Runners-up
 W = Winners

Seasons

References

aleaguestats.com

Brisbane Roar FC seasons
B
Roar